The city of Chicago, Illinois, has many cultural institutions and museums, large and small.  Major cultural institutions include:  
the Art Institute of Chicago, Chicago Symphony Orchestra, Chicago Architecture Foundation, Lyric Opera of Chicago, Goodman Theater, Joffrey Ballet, Central Public Harold Washington Library, and the Chicago Cultural Center, all in the Loop;
Lincoln Park's Lincoln Park Zoo, Lincoln Park Conservatory, Chicago History Museum, Chicago Academy of Sciences/Peggy Notebaert Nature Museum and Steppenwolf Theatre;
the Field Museum, Shedd Aquarium, and Adler Planetarium in the Near South Side's Museum Campus;
the Museum of Science and Industry, Oriental Institute, Smart Museum of Art, and DuSable Museum in Hyde Park; 
the Museum of Contemporary Art, The Second City comedy troupe, and the Chicago Shakespeare Theater in Near North Side; 
the Garfield Park Conservatory; 
and Pilsen's National Museum of Mexican Art; 
as well as the Brookfield Zoo, Chicago Botanic Gardens, and Morton Arboretum in nearby suburbs.

Museums

Art 
 659 Wrightwood
Art Institute of Chicago, second largest art museum in the United States
 The Arts Club of Chicago
 Chicago Athenaeum
 Chicago Cultural Center
 DePaul Art Museum (DePaul University)
 Design Museum of Chicago
 Intuit: The Center for Intuitive and Outsider Art
 Loyola University Museum of Art
 Museum of Contemporary Art
 Museum of Contemporary Photography
 National Museum of Mexican Art
 National Veterans Art Museum
 Smart Museum of Art (University of Chicago)
 Ukrainian Institute of Modern Art
wndr museum

Architecture

 Charnley–Persky House
 Chicago Architecture Center
 Driehaus Museum
 Graham Foundation for Advanced Studies in the Fine Arts
 Robie House

Children's
 Bronzeville Children's Museum
 Chicago Children's Museum
 Swedish American Museum and Children's Museum of Immigration

Chicago history

 Chicago History Museum
 Chicago Maritime Museum
 Clarke House Museum
 Edgewater Historical Society & Museum
 Glessner House Museum
 Jane Addams Hull-House Museum
 McCormick Bridgehouse & Chicago River Museum
 Norwood Park Historical Society Museum
 The Walt Disney Birthplace

Cultural

 Alliance Française de Chicago
 American Writers Museum
 Balzekas Museum of Lithuanian Culture
 Chinese-American Museum of Chicago
 Copernicus Foundation
 DANK Haus German American Cultural Center
 DuSable Museum of African American History
 Haitian American Museum of Chicago
 Irish American Heritage Center
 Lithuanian Research and Studies Center
 National Hellenic Museum
 National Italian American Sports Hall of Fame
 National Museum of Puerto Rican Arts and Culture
 Mitchell Museum of the American Indian
 Polish Museum of America
 Spertus Institute for Jewish Learning and Leadership
 Swedish American Museum Center
 Ukrainian National Museum

Specialized/historical

 A. Philip Randolph Pullman Porter Museum
 Chicago Sports Museum
 Leather Archives and Museum
 Money Museum
 Museum of Broadcast Communications
 Pritzker Military Museum & Library
 American Toby Jug Museum
Vegan Museum

Science, archeology, and natural history

 Adler Planetarium
 Field Museum of Natural History
 International Museum of Surgical Science
 Museum of Science and Industry
 Oriental Institute Museum
 Peggy Notebaert Nature Museum

Planned museums
 Barack Obama Presidential Center

Defunct museums
 ABA Museum of Law, closed in 2011
 American Police Center & Museum
 McCormick Tribune Freedom Museum, closed in 2009
 Museum of Holography 
 The Peace Museum
 Smith Museum of Stained Glass Windows, closed in 2014
 Terra Museum, closed on October 31, 2004, its foundation still exists and artworks travel.

Not-for-profit and university galleries
 American Academy of Art - Bill L. Parks Gallery
 Anchor Graphics, Columbia College Chicago
 ARC Gallery
 Beacon Street Gallery and Performance Company
 Boeing Galleries
 Bridgeport Art Center
 Catholic Theological Union - The Mary-Frances and Bill Veeck Gallery
 Center for Book and Paper Arts, Columbia College Chicago 
 Chicago Architecture Foundation
 Chicago State University - President's Galley and University Gallery
 City Gallery at the Historic Water Tower
 Columbia College Chicago - Glass Curtain Gallery, Hokin Gallery and Annex
 Copernicus Foundation
 DePaul Art Museum
 Gallery 400 at the University of Illinois at Chicago
 Hairpin Arts Center
 Hyde Park Art Center
 Illinois Institute of Technology - Kemper Gallery in the Galvin Library
 ISM Chicago Gallery
 John David Mooney Foundation - International Currents Gallery
 Lillstreet Art Center
 Little Black Pearl Art & Design Center
 Loyola University Chicago - Crown Center Gallery
 Marwen
 Northeastern Illinois University - Fine Arts Gallery
 Old Town Triangle Art Center
 The Palette and Chisel Academy of Fine Arts
 Renaissance Society
 Robert Morris University Illinois - State Street Gallery
 Roosevelt University - Gage Gallery
 Saint Xavier University - SXU Gallery
 School of the Art Institute of Chicago - Sullivan Galleries and Betty Rymer Gallery
 South Side Community Art Center
 South Shore Cultural Center
 Spudnik Press Cooperative
 University of Chicago Galleries - Logan Center, Neubauer Family Collegium for Culture and Society Gallery, and Regenstein Library exhibits
 Woman Made Gallery

Nature

 Garfield Park Conservatory
 Lincoln Park Conservatory
 Lincoln Park Zoo
 Shedd Aquarium

Libraries

 Chicago Public Library
 Gerber/Hart Library
 John Crerar Library
 Newberry Library
 Poetry Foundation
 Ryerson & Burnham Libraries

Music, theater, and performing arts

Dance
 Chicago Ballet
 Chicago Dance Crash
 Chicago Festival Ballet
 Clinard Dance
 DanceWorks Chicago
 Giordano Jazz Dance Chicago
 Hedwig Dances
 Hubbard Street Dance Chicago
 Joel Hall Dancers
 Joffrey Ballet
 River North Chicago Dance Company
 Ruth Page Center for the Arts (Ruth Page Civic Ballet)
 Thodos Dance Chicago

Opera
 Chamber Opera Chicago
 Chicago Opera Theater
 DuPage Opera Theatre
 Light Opera Works
 Lithuanian Opera Company of Chicago
 Lyric Opera of Chicago
 Opera in Focus

Opera houses
 Civic Opera House
 DuPage Opera Theatre
 Woodstock Opera House

Symphony
 Chicago Sinfonietta
 Chicago Symphony Orchestra
 Grant Park Symphony Orchestra

Choruses
 Apollo Chorus of Chicago
 Bella Voce
 Chicago a cappella
 Chicago Children's Choir
 Chicago Chorale
 Chicago Gay Men's Chorus
 Chicago Symphony Chorus

Music venues
 

 Gateway Theater
 Harris Theater
 Jay Pritzker Pavilion
 Metro
 Petrillo Music Shell
 Riviera Theatre
 Rosemont Theater
 Symphony Center

Theater

Festivals and fairs

Online museums
 The Museum of Classic Chicago Television
 Museum of Holography

Organizations
 Chicago Art Dealers Association
 Chicago Artists' Coalition
 Chicago Department of Cultural Affairs and Special Events
 Chicago Public Art Group
 Chicago Public Art Program
 Chicago Society of Artists
 Flat Iron Artists Association
 Illinois Artisans Program
 Illinois Arts Council
 Jazz Institute of Chicago
 Lawyers for the Creative Arts
 League of Chicago Theatres
 Public Media Institute
 Terra Foundation for American Art

See also
 Culture of Chicago
 List of colleges and universities in Chicago
 List of museums in Illinois
 Music of Chicago
 River North Chicago
 Visual arts of Chicago

References

External links
 A guide to Chicago's museums and cultural institutions
 Guide to Chicago house-museums
 Art Collecting: Chicago Art Galleries

Chicago-related lists
Culture of Chicago
Chicago
 
museums